Carlos Socias (born 23 November 1951) is a Dominican judoka. He competed in the men's middleweight event at the 1972 Summer Olympics.

References

1951 births
Living people
Dominican Republic male judoka
Olympic judoka of the Dominican Republic
Judoka at the 1972 Summer Olympics
Place of birth missing (living people)